Jura (Zhura) is a village in the Rîbnița District of Moldova. It has since 1990 been administered as a part of the self-proclaimed Pridnestrovian Moldavian Republic (PMR).

References

Populated places in Moldova
Bratslav Voivodeship
Baltsky Uyezd
Rîbnița District